Corabia is a small Danube port located in Olt County, Oltenia, Romania, which used to be part of the now-dissolved Romanați County before World War II. Across the Danube from Corabia lies the Bulgarian village of Gigen.

History

Beneath Corabia, around the former village of Celei, lie the remains of Sucidava, an old Dacian and Roman town and fortress. Near the town, Emperor Constantine the Great built the longest European bridge over the Danube. The bridge was destroyed during the Avar invasions, probably in the 7th century.  The ruins also contain an old Roman bath and an old basilica.  The name Corabia reflects the fact that the new settlement was built from the remains of a wrecked Genoan ship (corabia is the Romanian language term for "sailing ship", specifically used for "galley"). It became a thriving port in the 1880s.

Under the communist regime, Corabia developed as a considerable manufacturing town, with a sugar mill, furniture factory, tannery, a fiber manufacturing plant, and various other facilities. However, in more recent times the town's population has dwindled. Many inhabitants have migrated to larger towns in the wake of the closure of many of Corabia's factories.

Geography
Corabia is located in the southern part of Olt County, on the left bank of the Danube, on the border with Bulgaria.  It administers two villages, Tudor Vladimirescu and Vârtopu. The town houses a football club, several shops and bars, the remains of the Roman castrum Sucidava, dating back to the Roman period and featuring the "Secret Fountain" (an unusual piece of engineering); the Holy Trinity Orthodox Cathedral (one of the largest buildings of its kind in Romania), as well a monumental statue in the middle of the town square commemorating the use of Corabia's facilities in the initial attack during the Romanian War of Independence of 1877. Corabia also has an important archaeological museum with, inter alia, a remarkable collection of Roman pottery. From the town harbour one can make trips along the Danube, with stops at the nearby Băloi Island.

Natives
 Pavel Chihaia
 Theodor Danetti
 Nicolae Dobrescu
 
 Pola Illéry
 Șerban Ionescu
 
 Virgil Mazilescu
 Ion Oblemenco
 Ion Rîmaru
 Robert Săceanu
 Vladimir Screciu
 Cristina Vărzaru
 Ștefan Voitec

Gallery

References

 
Towns in Romania
Populated places on the Danube
Populated places in Olt County
Localities in Oltenia
Port cities and towns in Romania